Paul Meier (July 24, 1924 – August 7, 2011) was a statistician who promoted the use of randomized trials in medicine.

Meier is known for introducing, with Edward L. Kaplan, the Kaplan–Meier estimator, a method for measuring how many patients survive a medical treatment from one duration to another, taking into account that the sampled population changes over time.

Meier's 1957 evaluation of polio vaccine practices published in Science has been described as influential, and the Kaplan-Meier method is thought to have indirectly extended tens of thousands of lives.

Bibliography

References

External links

1924 births
2011 deaths
American statisticians
Fellows of the American Statistical Association
Presidents of the Institute of Mathematical Statistics
Fellows of the American Association for the Advancement of Science
Oberlin College alumni
Members of the National Academy of Medicine
Biostatisticians